Ecromeximab is a chimeric monoclonal antibody being developed for the treatment of malignant melanoma.

The drug was developed by Kyowa Hakko Kogyo Co., Ltd.  As of December 2015 development had been discontinued.

References 

Monoclonal antibodies
Abandoned drugs